Setmanari de Comunicació Directa, usually known as La Directa, is a biweekly magazine in Catalan language published in Barcelona and distributed in paper and digital format. The headquarters are in Sants, a neighbourhood of Barcelona, even though it has correspondents in several places of the Catalan Countries as well as other parts of the world. It covers a wide range of topics mostly related to left-wing politics, social movements and social economy including news, investigation and debate articles.

Awards
 2010: Memorial Josep Vidal i Llecha
 2014: Special mention Premi Solidaritat

References

External links
 Official website 

2006 establishments in Catalonia
Biweekly magazines published in Spain
Magazines established in 2008
Magazines published in Barcelona
News magazines published in Spain
Socialist magazines